Ildar Ravilovich Shaymardanov is a  Soviet and Russia's swordsman. Champion of the USSR 1986-1991's championship team in foil fencing. Russian first championship winner in the men's foil (1993). Master of sports of international class of Russia (2004). Honored coach of Russia (2013).

He graduated from the sports faculty of the Kazan State Pedagogical Institute.

From 1997 to coaching. Trained Kamilla Gafurzianova. At the Olympic Games in London, she took silver in the team foil.

At the present time - Vice-President of the FFR, senior coach of the Russian team in the reserve (women's foil), director of the Sports School Fencing Tatarstan.

References

External links
Profile on the website of Russian Fencing Federation
 Заслуженное признание

1963 births
Living people
Sportspeople from Kazan
Soviet male fencers
Russian male fencers
Honoured Coaches of Russia
Tatar people of Russia